Sean Fleming may refer to:
 Sean Fleming (gridiron football) (born 1970), former Canadian football placekicker and punter
 Seán Fleming (born 1958), Irish Fianna Fáil politician
 Shaun Fleming (born 1987), American actor and musician